Thomas Eugene Dublinski (August 8, 1930 – November 26, 2015) was a professional American football quarterback who played in five NFL seasons from 1952–1960 for 3 different teams including the Detroit Lions. He also saw playing time in the Canadian Football League with the Toronto Argonauts and Hamilton Tiger-Cats. Dublinski died on Thanksgiving Day, November 26, 2015.

References

1930 births
2015 deaths
American football quarterbacks
Denver Broncos (AFL) players
Detroit Lions players
Hamilton Tiger-Cats players
New York Giants players
Sportspeople from Chicago
Toronto Argonauts players
Utah Utes football players
Canadian football quarterbacks
Players of American football from Chicago